Cosmosoma gemmata is a moth of the family Erebidae. It was described by Arthur Gardiner Butler in 1876. It is found in Panama and Colombia.

References

gemmata
Moths described in 1876